The St. Gregory the Illuminator Cathedral  also called Armenian Church of St. Gregory the Illuminator is an Armenian Catholic cathedral located at 2 Rene Pio, Neos Kosmos in Athens, Greece. 

It functions as the seat of the Armenian Catholic Ordinariate of Greece a jurisdiction created for Catholics of the Armenian rite that was established in 1925 by Pope Pius XI and directly under the administration of the Holy See.

Currently the ordinariate is vacant so it does not have a bishop responsible. Father Hovsep Bezazian is the apostolic administrator.

See also
Roman Catholicism in Greece
St. Gregory the Illuminator

References

Eastern Catholic cathedrals in Greece
Cathedrals in Athens
Armenian Catholic cathedrals
Armenia–Greece relations